The Hundred of Bray refers to a cadastral unit (land division) of a hundred. It may refer to:
 The Hundred of Bray, in Palmerston County, Northern Territory, Australia
 The Hundred of Bray (South Australia)
 The Hundred of Bray, Berkshire, England